BMA-Arai Echmiadzin, is a defunct Armenian football club from the town of Vagharshapat (Etchmiadzin}, Armavir Province.

History 
The club was founded in 1967 during the Soviet period. Before the formation of Championship of Independent Armenia, the team itself is nowhere really could not show, only in 1990 start a professional stage in the second league of the USSR where they were in the 7th place.

In 1992 the team performed in the championship of Armenia in the Premier League, on the basis of which they occupied 10th place and booked a place in the highest league in the next year.

In the Armenian Cup the team reached the quarterfinals and beat team Van Yerevan 0:2. These results remain the best in the history of the team's performance in the elite league of the Armenian championship. Though poor results in subsequent seasons which was 13th and 14th sent the team in lower division in the First League, where they will continue the performance. In the unofficial championship of 1995 team takes third place and bronze medals. However, through the biennial team will come down from competing in the tournament.

League record

Head coach 
  B. Yeghiazaryan  (1990) 
  Samvel Ayvazian (1991)
  Arkady Andriasyan (1992–1993)
  Ashot Martirosyan (1993)
  Rudik Avanesyan (1993)
  Gevond Pogosyan (1994)

References

External links 
 BMA-Arai  at foot.dk 
 RSSSF Armenia (and subpages per year)

Defunct football clubs in Armenia
Association football clubs established in 1967
Association football clubs disestablished in 2005
1967 establishments in Armenia
2005 disestablishments in Armenia
Vagharshapat